is a 2003 Japanese action movie, starring Kasumi Nakane. A sequel to Gun Crazy: A Woman from Nowhere, it was also directed by Atsushi Muroga.

Cast

 Kasumi Nakane
 Mitsuho Otani
 Hiroshi Fuse
 Yasukaze Motomiya
 Jin Nakayama

References

External links 

2003 films
2000s Japanese-language films
Girls with guns films
Shochiku films
2000s Japanese films